Ellisville Township is one of twenty-six townships in Fulton County, Illinois, USA.  As of the 2010 census, its population was 155 and it contained 69 housing units.

History
Ellisville Township is named for Levi D. Ellis, an early settler.

Geography

Cities, towns, villages
 Ellisville

Extinct towns
 Ellisville Station, a mining community on Narrow Gauge Railroad until the 1920s, consisted of a railroad depot, grocery store, butcher shop and barber shop plus numerous company-owned miner's houses. The mining company went under and the town vanished. It lasted from 1896 to about 1926. From 1909 to 1913 it had a post office here.

Cemeteries
The township contains these four cemeteries: Ellisville, Heartley, Landon and Pleasant Hill.

Major highways
  Illinois Route 116

Landmarks
 Mount Pisgah Park, a 40-acre tract located southeast of Ellisville, IL, was owned by Fulton County until September, 2009, when it was sold at public auction.  The new owner, John Wiemers is maintaining the property as a recreational site now known as "Mount Pisgah . . .a peaceful place."

Demographics

School districts
 Avon Community Unit School District 176
 Spoon River Valley Community Unit School District 4

Political districts
 Illinois' 17th congressional district
 State House District 94
 State Senate District 47

References
 
 United States Census Bureau 2007 TIGER/Line Shapefiles
 United States National Atlas

External links
 City-Data.com
 Illinois State Archives

Townships in Fulton County, Illinois
Townships in Illinois